is a Japanese professional wrestler. He is currently signed to WWE, where he performs on the SmackDown brand.

Nakamura is known for his time in New Japan Pro-Wrestling (NJPW), where he is a former three-time IWGP Heavyweight Champion, with his first reign coming at the age of 23 years and 9 months; making Nakamura the youngest IWGP Heavyweight Champion. His other accomplishments within the company include winning the 2011 G1 Climax and the 2014 New Japan Cup, and being the final IWGP Third Belt Champion, the final NWF Heavyweight Champion, and the longest reigning IWGP Intercontinental Champion for his first reign (he formerly held the record for most reigns at five). He is also a founding member and the original leader of the stable Chaos.

Vividly unrestrained and expressive, Nakamura portrays a wildly random and erratic mixed martial arts enigma, emotionally charged by the sound of violins. A pre-WWE gimmick, Nakamura played the character in other wrestling companies that he was contracted to prior. Nakamura's wrestling style is not merely gimmick as he has notably competed in mixed martial arts, amassing a 3–1 (1) record.

Prior to his main roster debut in WWE, Nakamura competed in the company's NXT brand, where he became a two-time NXT Champion. In January 2018, Nakamura won the 2018 Men's Royal Rumble match, and later won the WWE United States Championship twice. He won the Intercontinental Championship for the first time in 2019 at Extreme Rules, making him the second wrestler (behind Chris Jericho) to hold both WWE and IWGP Intercontinental Championships. Nakamura is also a former WWE SmackDown Tag Team Champion with Cesaro. From July 2021 to October of the same year, Nakamura dubbed himself King Nakamura due to being in possession of the King of the Ring crown, although he never won the tournament. Overall, Nakamura is a five-time world champion in professional wrestling.

Early life 
Shinsuke Nakamura was born in Mineyama, Kyoto, on February 24, 1980. As a child, his favorite wrestler was Jushin Liger.

Professional wrestling career

New Japan Pro-Wrestling

Super Rookie (2002–2005) 
Nakamura joined NJPW in March 2002 and quickly began making a name for himself as a bright prospect for the company. Having earned the nickname "Super Rookie", Nakamura impressed both NJPW officials and fans with an excellent combination of strength, speed, and technical skill. Alongside fellow rookies Hiroshi Tanahashi and Katsuyori Shibata, Nakamura became known as one of the "new Three Musketeers". Nakamura began training vale tudo and on December 31 made his mixed martial arts debut in a fight, where he was defeated by Daniel Gracie via submission to an armlock. Nakamura's second MMA fight took place on May 2, 2003, when he defeated Jan Nortje with a guillotine choke. He followed that up on September 13 with another submission victory over Shane Eitner in his third MMA fight. On December 9, Nakamura defeated Hiroyoshi Tenzan for the IWGP Heavyweight Championship, thus becoming the youngest wrestler in history to win the title. On January 4, 2004, at Wrestling World 2004, Nakamura successfully defended the IWGP Heavyweight Championship against the NWF Heavyweight Champion Yoshihiro Takayama in a title unification match. However, Nakamura was forced to vacate the title due to an injury just a month later.

Upon his return, Nakamura received a shot at the title, now held by Bob Sapp, but he was defeated by the defending champion on May 3. Later that month, Nakamura competed in his last MMA fight, defeating Alexey Ignashov with a forearm choke on May 22. On December 11, Nakamura and his tag team partner Hiroshi Tanahashi defeated Kensuke Sasaki and Minoru Suzuki in a decision match to win the IWGP Tag Team Championship. On January 4, 2005, at Toukon Festival: Wrestling World 2005, Nakamura defeated his own tag team partner to win the IWGP U-30 Openweight Championship. During their tag team title reign, the two left for an excursion to Mexico, where they feuded with Los Guerreros del Infierno and defended the IWGP Tag Team Championship against Rey Bucanero and Olímpico. On October 30, they lost the IWGP Tag Team Championship to Cho-Ten (Hiroyoshi Tenzan and Masahiro Chono).

Excursion and return (2006–2009) 
Nakamura challenged Brock Lesnar for the IWGP Heavyweight Championship on January 4, 2006, at Toukon Shidou Chapter 1, but he lost. In March 2006, Nakamura announced that he would depart on a learning excursion to further improve his wrestling skills. Among other things, he would travel to Mexico, Brazil and Russia as well as train with Lesnar at Lesnar's personal gym to gain muscle mass. NJPW President Simon Inoki later suggested that as part of his learning excursion, Nakamura would be loaned to World Wrestling Entertainment (WWE) to gain experience in working large American shows. However, it proved to be mostly speculation and never came to pass as Nakamura was urgently needed back in New Japan due to Lesnar's departure.

On September 24, Nakamura made his long-awaited return to New Japan, joining Masahiro Chono's Black New Japan faction, which had the goal of reforming New Japan with Chono as the president and Nakamura as the "ace". Nakamura had greatly improved his muscular mass during his overseas training and also debuted a new finisher, called the Landslide. On December 10, Nakamura was unable to win the IWGP Heavyweight Championship from then-champion Tanahashi and was again unsuccessful on January 4, 2007, at the Wrestle Kingdom in Tokyo Dome show, where he lost to Toshiaki Kawada. Nakamura entered the 2007 G1 Climax tournament, where he reached the semi-finals before dislocating his shoulder. The injury sidelined Nakamura for months, but he made his return on November 11 and took over the leadership of Black New Japan from Chono and reformed the faction under the new name RISE. The faction originally consisted of himself, Minoru, Milano Collection A.T., Hirooki Goto, Giant Bernard, Travis Tomko and Prince Devitt. Low Ki was later added to the stable after Milano was injured, having impressed Nakamura during an appearance when he was still with Impact Wrestling! (Formerly TNA). On December 9, Nakamura defeated Togi Makabe to earn an IWGP Heavyweight Championship match at the following month's Tokyo Dome show.

On January 4, 2008, Nakamura defeated his rival Tanahashi in the main event of Wrestle Kingdom II in Tokyo Dome, winning the IWGP Heavyweight Championship for the second time. On February 17, Nakamura defeated Kurt Angle to win the IGF version of the IWGP Heavyweight Championship, unifying it with his own NJPW version of the title. He lost the IWGP Heavyweight Championship to All Japan Pro Wrestling (AJPW) representative Keiji Mutoh in Osaka on April 27.

On September 5, Nakamura and RISE stablemate Hirooki Goto unsuccessfully challenged Togi Makabe and Toru Yano for the IWGP Tag Team Championship. Immediately after the match, the duo were attacked by Giant Bernard, Rick Fuller and the returning Low Ki, who had just left RISE to join Makabe's GBH faction. On February 15, 2009, Nakamura faced Tanahashi for the IWGP Heavyweight Championship, but he failed to regain the title.

King of Strong Style (2009–2012) 

In April 2009, Nakamura turned into a villain, siding with the former members of GBH (especially Toru Yano) in a feud against Togi Makabe and Tomoaki Honma. This new group was soon named Chaos with Nakamura as their leader. Nakamura began to work a much rougher style, using a lot of knees and continuing to use a straight right hand as a frequent move in addition to the Bomaye (renamed Kinshasa in WWE), his new finisher. It was the Bomaye that took him to the finals of the 2009 G1 Climax, where he lost to Makabe. Prior to the final, Nakamura had gone undefeated, winning each match with the Bomaye. The move was also credited for fracturing IWGP Heavyweight Champion Hiroshi Tanahashi's orbital bone in the semi-finals of the G1, which forced Tanahashi to vacate the title later that month.

On September 27, Nakamura avenged his G1 loss and defeated Makabe in a decision match to win the IWGP Heavyweight title for a third time. Upon winning the title, Nakamura drew the ire of Antonio Inoki by announcing his plan of wanting to restore the "Strong Style" of New Japan by capturing the original IWGP Heavyweight Championship belt from Inoki to replace the fourth generation title belt held by Nakamura. On October 12, Nakamura successfully defended the title against Shinjiro Otani. On November 8 at Destruction '09, Nakamura successfully defended the title against previous champion Hiroshi Tanahashi. On December 5, Nakamura retained the title by defeating Yuji Nagata. On January 4, 2010, at Wrestle Kingdom IV in Tokyo Dome, Nakamura successfully defended the IWGP Heavyweight Championship against Yoshihiro Takayama in a rematch of their 2004 Tokyo Dome title unification bout. After defeating Takayama, Nakamura was challenged by Manabu Nakanishi, whom he would pin on February 14 at New Japan's ISM show in Sumo Hall, making his fifth defense. On April 4, Nakamura made his sixth successful title defense against the 2010 New Japan Cup winner and former teammate Hirooki Goto and afterwards accepted Togi Makabe's challenge for the title. On May 3 at Wrestling Dontaku 2010, Nakamura lost the IWGP Heavyweight Championship to Makabe. Following the loss, Nakamura was sidelined with a shoulder injury until he returned on June 19 at Dominion 6.19, defeating Daniel Puder. Atsushi Sawada and Simon Inoki of IGF appeared at the show and seemed to eye up Nakamura after the match. On July 19, Nakamura received a rematch for the IWGP Heavyweight Championship, but he was once again defeated by Makabe. The following month, Nakamura entered the 2010 G1 Climax, where he won four out of his seven-round robin stage matches, including one over eventual winner Satoshi Kojima, leading his block heading to the final day, where he wrestled Pro Wrestling Noah's Go Shiozaki to a 30-minute time limit draw and thus missed the finals of the tournament by a single point. The draw with Shiozaki led to a no time limit match at a Pro Wrestling Noah show on August 22, where Nakamura was defeated. Despite losing to Goto in a number one contender's match on October 11, Nakamura was hand-picked by new IWGP Heavyweight Champion Satoshi Kojima as his first challenger. The title match took place on December 11 and ended with Nakamura losing.

On January 4, 2011, Nakamura avenged his loss to Go Shiozaki by defeating him in a singles match at Wrestle Kingdom V in Tokyo Dome. On May 3, Nakamura failed in his attempt to regain the IWGP Heavyweight Championship from Hiroshi Tanahashi. From late May to early June, Nakamura worked a tour with Mexican promotion Consejo Mundial de Lucha Libre (CMLL), whom New Japan had a working agreement with. On August 1, Nakamura entered the 2011 G1 Climax and after winning seven out of his nine-round robin stage matches finished first in his block to advance to the finals of the tournament. On August 14, Nakamura defeated Tetsuya Naito to win the 2011 G1 Climax and earn another shot at the IWGP Heavyweight Championship. Nakamura went on to challenge for the IWGP Heavyweight Championship on September 19, but he failed to recapture the title from Tanahashi. In the 2011 G1 Tag League, Nakamura teamed with Toru Yano as the Chaos Top Team, winning all five of their group stage matches, advancing to the semi-finals of the tournament with a clean sheet. On November 6, Nakamura and Yano were eliminated from the tournament in the semi-finals by the team of Lance Archer and Minoru Suzuki. On January 4, 2012, at Wrestle Kingdom VI in Tokyo Dome, the Chaos Top Team was defeated by Pro Wrestling Noah representatives Go Shiozaki and Naomichi Marufuji.

IWGP Intercontinental Champion (2012–2016) 

On July 22, Nakamura defeated Hirooki Goto to win the IWGP Intercontinental Championship for the first time. In August's 2012 G1 Climax tournament, Nakamura wrestled in the same block as fellow Chaos member and recent IWGP Heavyweight Champion Kazuchika Okada. The two stablemates faced each other on August 5, with Nakamura picking up the win, effectively solidifying his spot as the leader of Chaos in the process. After four wins and three losses, Nakamura was defeated in the final day of the tournament by Hiroyoshi Tenzan and was thus eliminated from the finals, failing to defend his crown. On August 26, Nakamura traveled to the United States to make his first successful defense of the IWGP Intercontinental Championship, defeating Oliver John at a Sacramento Wrestling Federation (SWF) event in Gridley, California. The following day, Nakamura threw the ceremonial first pitch at a Major League Baseball game between the Texas Rangers and Tampa Bay Rays in Arlington, Texas. On October 8 at King of Pro-Wrestling, Nakamura successfully defended the IWGP Intercontinental Championship in a rematch against Hirooki Goto. On November 11 at Power Struggle, Nakamura made his third successful defense against Karl Anderson. From November 20 to December 1, Nakamura took part in the round-robin portion of the 2012 World Tag League, alongside stablemate Tomohiro Ishii under the tag team name Chaos Invincible. The team finished with a record of three wins, which included a win over stablemates Kazuchika Okada and Yoshi-Hashi as well as three losses, failing to advance from their block. On January 4, 2013, at Wrestle Kingdom 7 in Tokyo Dome, Nakamura defeated Kazushi Sakuraba for his fourth successful defense of the IWGP Intercontinental Championship. From January 18 to 19, Nakamura took part in the Fantastica Mania 2013 weekend, co-promoted by New Japan and CMLL. In the main event of the second night, Nakamura made his fifth successful defense of the IWGP Intercontinental Championship against La Sombra. In early 2013, Nakamura became involved in Chaos' rivalry with New Japan's other top villainous stable, Suzuki-gun. On March 3 at New Japan's 41st anniversary event, Nakamura defeated Suzuki-gun's Lance Archer for his sixth successful title defense. On April 5, Nakamura and Ishii unsuccessfully challenged KES (Archer and Davey Boy Smith Jr.) for the IWGP Tag Team Championship. Two days later at Invasion Attack, Nakamura successfully defended the IWGP Intercontinental Championship against Smith, avenging the previous loss from the first round of the New Japan Cup. On May 3 at Wrestling Dontaku 2013, Nakamura defeated Suzuki-gun's newest member Shelton X Benjamin for his eighth successful defense of the IWGP Intercontinental Championship.

On May 11, Nakamura left for another tour with Mexican promotion CMLL. His first match back in Mexico took place the following day, when he teamed with El Felino and Negro Casas in a six-man tag team two out of three falls match at Arena Coliseo, where they were defeated by Máscara Dorada, Rush and Titán. Nakamura quickly started a rivalry with La Sombra and after suffering two pinfall defeats in six-man tag team matches on April 17 and 24 accepted his challenge for the IWGP Intercontinental Championship, setting up a Fantastica Mania 2013 rematch between the two. The match took place on May 31 and saw Nakamura once again losing to La Sombra for the IWGP Intercontinental Champion, ending his reign at 313 days and eight successful title defenses. Nakamura wrestled his final match of the tour on June 9, when he was defeated by Rush in a singles match. Nakamura returned to New Japan on June 22 at Dominion 6.22 in a tag team match, where he and Tomohiro Ishii were defeated by Minoru Suzuki and Shelton X Benjamin, who pinned Nakamura for the win. On July 20, Nakamura regained the IWGP Intercontinental Championship from La Sombra, becoming the first multi-time holder of the title. From August 1 to 11, Nakamura took part in the 2013 G1 Climax. Finishing with a record of five wins and four losses, Nakamura narrowly failed to advance to the finals after losing to Shelton X Benjamin on the final day. On September 29 at Destruction, Nakamura defeated Benjamin to make the first successful defense of his second reign as the IWGP Intercontinental Champion. His second successful defense took place on October 14 at King of Pro-Wrestling, when he defeated Pro Wrestling Noah representative Naomichi Marufuji. On November 9 at Power Struggle, Nakamura made his third successful title defense against Minoru Suzuki in a match which had the added stipulation that Nakamura would have had to join Suzuki-gun had he lost the title. Post-match, Nakamura nominated Hiroshi Tanahashi as his next challenger, setting up the first title match between the two longtime rivals in over two years. From November 23 to December 7, Nakamura and Ishii took part in the 2013 World Tag League, where they finished with a record of three wins and three losses, with a loss against Togi Makabe and Tomoaki Honma on the final day costing them a spot in the semi-finals.

On January 4, 2014, Nakamura lost the IWGP Intercontinental Championship to Tanahashi in the main event of Wrestle Kingdom 8 in Tokyo Dome. A rematch between the two took place on February 9 at The New Beginning in Hiroshima and saw Nakamura fail in his attempt to regain the IWGP Intercontinental Championship. In March, Nakamura took part in the 2014 New Japan Cup, which he eventually won, defeating Bad Luck Fale in the finals on March 23 and afterwards challenged Tanahashi to another rematch for the IWGP Intercontinental Championship. On April 6 at Invasion Attack 2014, Nakamura defeated Tanahashi to win the IWGP Intercontinental Championship for the third time. The following month, Nakamura took part in NJPW's North American tour, defeating Ring of Honor (ROH) wrestler Kevin Steen in an interpromotional match on May 17 at War of the Worlds. On May 25 at Back to the Yokohama Arena, Nakamura made the first successful defense of his third reign as the IWGP Intercontinental Champion against Daniel Gracie. On June 21 at Dominion 6.21, Nakamura lost the title to Bad Luck Fale in his second defense. In the 2014 G1 Climax, Nakamura won his block with eight wins and two losses, advancing to the finals. On August 10, Nakamura was defeated in the finals by Chaos stablemate Kazuchika Okada. On September 21 at Destruction in Kobe, Nakamura regained the IWGP Intercontinental Championship from Bad Luck Fale. He made his first successful title defense on November 8 at Power Struggle against Katsuyori Shibata. From November 23 to December 5, Nakamura took part in the 2014 World Tag League alongside Tomohiro Ishii. The team finished second in their block with a record of four wins and three losses, narrowly missing the finals of the tournament due to losing to Hirooki Goto and Katsuyori Shibata on the final day. On January 4, 2015, at Wrestle Kingdom 9 in Tokyo Dome, Nakamura made his second successful defense of the IWGP Intercontinental Championship against Kota Ibushi. His third defense took place on February 14 at The New Beginning in Sendai, where Nakamura defeated Yuji Nagata. Nakamura's fourth title reign ended on May 3 at Wrestling Dontaku 2015, where he was defeated by Goto. Nakamura received a rematch for the title on July 5 at Dominion 7.5 in Osaka-jo Hall, but he was again defeated by Goto.

From July 23 to August 15, Nakamura took part in the round-robin stage of the 2015 G1 Climax. Despite missing one match due to an elbow injury, Nakamura won his block and advanced to the finals by defeating reigning IWGP Heavyweight Champion and Chaos stablemate Kazuchika Okada in his last round-robin match, giving him a record of seven wins and two losses. On August 16, Nakamura was defeated in the finals of the tournament by Hiroshi Tanahashi. On September 27 at Destruction in Kobe, Nakamura defeated Hirooki Goto to win the IWGP Intercontinental Championship for the fifth time; this would remain the record for most reigns until Tetsuya Naito became a six-time champion in 2020. He made his first successful title defense on November 7 at Power Struggle against Karl Anderson, avenging an earlier loss from the 2015 G1 Climax. He made his second successful defense on January 4, 2016, by defeating A.J. Styles at Wrestle Kingdom 10 in Tokyo Dome. Hours after the event, it was reported that Nakamura had given his notice to NJPW on the morning of January 4, announcing that he was leaving the promotion for WWE. Nakamura remained under NJPW contract and was expected to finish off his contracted dates with the promotion before leaving. On January 12, NJPW confirmed Nakamura's upcoming departure, announcing he would also be stripped of the IWGP Intercontinental Championship. Nakamura handed in the title on January 25, officially ending his fifth reign. Nakamura wrestled his last match under his NJPW contract on January 30, where he, Kazuchika Okada and Tomohiro Ishii defeated Hirooki Goto, Hiroshi Tanahashi and Katsuyori Shibata.

Before Nakamura's departure from NJPW, ROH had announced that he would be appearing at their 14th Anniversary Show in Las Vegas as part of ROH's cross-promotion deal with NJPW, but ROH was forced to pull him from the event due to Nakamura signing an exclusive WWE contract.

Total Nonstop Action Wrestling (2008) 
On January 28, 2008, Nakamura defeated Elix Skipper in a match taped for TNA Xplosion.

WWE

NXT Champion (2016–2017) 

On January 6, 2016, Nakamura confirmed in an interview with Tokyo Sports that he would be leaving NJPW at the end of the month and signing with WWE. On January 27, WWE officially announced that Nakamura would be taking part in the NXT TakeOver: Dallas event. On January 31, Nakamura was confirmed to have finished his NJPW commitments and was said to be reporting to the WWE Performance Center for training and handling logistical matters regarding his move to the company. On February 2, Nakamura arrived in Pittsburgh, Pennsylvania to undergo pre-contract signing medical tests. On February 22, WWE held a press conference in Tokyo, Japan to officially announce the signing of Nakamura to NXT. On April 1, Nakamura defeated Sami Zayn in his debut match at NXT TakeOver: Dallas in a critically acclaimed match. On the April 13 episode of NXT, Nakamura defeated Tye Dillinger in his NXT television debut. 

On the May 25 episode of NXT, Austin Aries declared his intention to become the next NXT Champion, which prompted a response from Nakamura, and NXT general manager William Regal then scheduled a match between the two on June 8 at NXT TakeOver: The End, which Nakamura won. On the June 15 episode of NXT, Nakamura challenged former NXT Champion Finn Bálor to a match that was accepted and won by Nakamura on the July 13 episode of NXT. On August 20 at NXT TakeOver: Brooklyn II, Nakamura defeated Samoa Joe to win the NXT Championship for the first time. On November 19 at NXT TakeOver: Toronto, Nakamura lost the title to Joe in his first defense, marking his first televised loss in NXT. On the December 28 episode of NXT from Osaka, Japan, Nakamura would regain the NXT Championship from Samoa Joe. On the January 4, 2017, episode of NXT, he successfully defended the championship against Joe in a steel cage match. On January 28 at NXT TakeOver: San Antonio, Nakamura lost the championship to Bobby Roode. In his return match on March 8, Nakamura defeated T. J. Perkins and was put into a rematch to face Roode for the NXT Championship on April 1 at NXT TakeOver: Orlando, but he was unsuccessful in reclaiming the championship. On the April 12 episode of NXT, Nakamura made his final NXT appearance, bidding farewell to the Full Sail University crowd.

WWE Championship pursuits (2017–2018) 
On the April 4 episode of SmackDown Live, the first episode after WrestleMania 33, Nakamura made his main roster debut, interrupting The Miz and Maryse following their promo mocking John Cena and Nikki Bella; however this did not spark a feud between Nakamura and Miz, since Miz would be traded to Raw because of the Superstar Shake-up. Nakamura began feuding with Dolph Ziggler, whom he defeated in his televised in-ring debut at Backlash on May 21. On the May 23 episode of SmackDown Live, it was announced that Nakamura along with AJ Styles, Baron Corbin, Dolph Ziggler, Kevin Owens and Sami Zayn would compete in the Money in the Bank ladder match at Money in the Bank on June 18, during which Corbin attacked him with both a ladder and a camera while making his entrance. Nakamura was checked on by medical staff and carried out of the arena, but he later returned during the match and attacked all other participants, only to lose the match when Corbin retrieved the briefcase. At Battleground on July 23, Nakamura defeated Corbin by disqualification after Corbin attacked him with a low blow. Two days later on SmackDown Live, Nakamura defeated Corbin in a rematch to end their feud. On the August 1 episode of SmackDown Live, Nakamura defeated John Cena to earn the right to challenge Jinder Mahal for the WWE Championship on August 20 at SummerSlam, where Nakamura lost after interference from The Singh Brothers and marking his first pinfall loss on the main roster. On the September 5 episode of SmackDown Live, Nakamura defeated Randy Orton to earn another title shot against Mahal for the title at Hell in a Cell on October 8, where he lost again. On the October 31 episode of SmackDown Live, Nakamura defeated Kevin Owens to earn a spot on Team SmackDown at Survivor Series on November 19, where he was the first man to be eliminated by Braun Strowman in the 5-on-5 Survivor Series elimination match against Team Raw. At Clash of Champions on December 17, Nakamura teamed up with Randy Orton in a losing effort against Kevin Owens and Sami Zayn, who retained their jobs with Daniel Bryan and Shane McMahon serving as special guest referees. On the inaugural episode of Mixed Match Challenge on January 16, 2018, Nakamura teamed with Natalya in the Mixed Match Challenge tournament, but the duo was defeated by Finn Bálor and Sasha Banks in the first round.

On January 28 at the Royal Rumble, Nakamura would enter the namesake match at number 14 and go on to win the men's Royal Rumble match after last eliminating Roman Reigns. Immediately afterwards, Nakamura announced that he would challenge AJ Styles for the WWE Championship at WrestleMania 34 on April 8, where he lost to Styles. After the match, Nakamura turned heel by attacking Styles with a low blow followed by a Kinshasa. On the following episode of SmackDown Live, Nakamura said in an interview that he got "too emotional" and was "sorry" for attacking Styles, but when asked to explain more, he sarcastically said "Sorry, no speak English". Later that night, Nakamura cemented his heel turn by attacking Styles and Daniel Bryan, low blowing Styles twice and striking Bryan in the back of the head with a Kinshasa. Nakamura continued to low blow Styles in the following weeks and it was announced that he would get a rematch for the title at the Greatest Royal Rumble. On the April 24 episode of SmackDown Live, Nakamura debuted a new entrance and theme song. At the Greatest Royal Rumble on April 27, Styles and Nakamura fought to a double count-out, with Styles retaining the WWE Championship. As a result, another rematch between Nakamura and Styles was made for Backlash with a no disqualification stipulation added on the May 1 episode of SmackDown Live. At the event on May 6, Nakamura and Styles fought to a no contest after low blowing each other, with Styles again retaining the title. Looking for a decisive winner, SmackDown Commissioner Shane McMahon announced one more rematch between Nakamura and Styles at Money in the Bank. Nakamura was granted the right to choose the stipulation for the match after defeating Styles on the May 15 episode of SmackDown Live, which he revealed the following week, to be a Last Man Standing match after attacking Styles with a Kinshasa and giving him a 10-count. At the event on June 17, Nakamura failed to win the title. Nakamura then suffered a minor injury after a police dog bit his left leg.

United States Champion (2018–2019) 
On July 3, it was announced that Nakamura would return in time to face Jeff Hardy for the WWE United States Championship at Extreme Rules. At the event on July 15, Nakamura won the title by executing a low blow and Kinshasa on Hardy, marking his first main roster title win; Nakamura was then confronted by the returning Randy Orton, who attacked Hardy before leaving. Nakamura would successfully defend the title in a rematch against Hardy at SummerSlam on August 19. On the August 27 episode of SmackDown Live, Nakamura would later refuse to compete, claiming that the United States of America had been renamed Naka-Merica and that he wouldn't face anyone until he found a worthy opponent. After refusing to defend the WWE United States Championship at the Hell in a Cell pay-per-view on September 16, general manager Paige ordered Nakamura to defend the championship on the September 18 episode of SmackDown Live, which he did so successfully, defeating Rusev. At SmackDown 1000, Nakamura lost to the returning Rey Mysterio in a qualifying match for the WWE World Cup at Crown Jewel. It was announced that Nakamura would defend the title against Rusev at Crown Jewel's kickoff show on November 2, in which he successfully retained. Nakamura lost to Raw's WWE Intercontinental Champion Seth Rollins in an interbrand Champion vs Champion match at Survivor Series on November 18. On the December 25 episode of SmackDown Live (taped on December 18), Nakamura lost the WWE United States Championship to Rusev, ending his reign at 156 days. 

On January 27, 2019, at the Royal Rumble, Nakamura defeated Rusev to win his second WWE United States Championship. Later that night, he participated in the Royal Rumble match entering at No. 3 but was eliminated by Mustafa Ali. Two days later on SmackDown Live, Nakamura lost the title to R-Truth. Rusev then confronted Truth and pushed him into a title match, but Truth retained the title. After the match, Nakamura joined forces with Rusev into attacking Truth, starting an alliance between the two. At the Fastlane pre-show on March 2, Nakamura and Rusev were defeated by The New Day. At WrestleMania 35 on April 7, Nakamura and Rusev would compete in a fatal four-way tag team match for the SmackDown Tag Team Championship, but were unsuccessful. The duo returned during the 51-Man Battle Royal at Super ShowDown on June 7, but they were both eliminated during the match.

The Artist Collective and Intercontinental Champion (2019–2021) 
At the Extreme Rules pre-show on July 14, Nakamura defeated Intercontinental Champion Finn Bálor to win the title for the first time in his career. This win made him the second man, after Chris Jericho, to have held both the IWGP and WWE Intercontinental Championship, as well as the first Asian-born wrestler to win the title. On July 27, he retained his title against Ali at Smackville. He then started an alliance with Sami Zayn, defeating The Miz with his help at Clash of Champions on September 15 to retain the title. At Crown Jewel on October 31, Nakamura was a member of Team Flair, where they lost to Team Hogan. At Survivor Series on November 24, Nakamura lost to NXT North American Champion Roderick Strong in an inter-brand triple threat match also involving Raw's United States Champion AJ Styles. On the November 29 episode of SmackDown, Nakamura and Zayn formed an alliance with Cesaro, as he and Nakamura unsuccessfully challenged The New Day for the SmackDown Tag Team Championship.

At Royal Rumble on January 26, Nakamura entered the Royal Rumble match at No. 11 but was eliminated by WWE Champion Brock Lesnar. On the January 31 episode of SmackDown, Nakamura lost the Intercontinental Championship to Braun Strowman, ending his reign at 201 days. At Elimination Chamber on March 8, Sami Zayn, along with Nakamura and Cesaro, defeated Braun Strowman in 3-on-1 handicap match for the Intercontinental Championship; Zayn won by pinning Strowman. Nakamura, Zayn and Cesaro then began feuding with Daniel Bryan and Drew Gulak, and on the first night of WrestleMania 36 on April 4, Zayn defeated Bryan to retain the Intercontinental Championship with the help of Nakamura and Cesaro. Nakamura began teaming with Cesaro more frequently as they feuded with New Day for the SmackDown Tag Team Championship. On the July 10 episode of SmackDown, Nakamura and Cesaro challenged New Day for the titles, but the match ended in a no contest with Cesaro and Nakamura putting Kofi Kingston and Big E through a table. On July 19 at The Horror Show at Extreme Rules, Nakamura and Cesaro defeated Kingston and Big E in a tables match to capture the titles, marking Nakamura's first tag team title in WWE.

During the 2020 WWE Draft episode of SmackDown on October 9, they lost the titles to The New Day's Kofi Kingston and Xavier Woods. On the 2020 WWE Draft episode of Raw on October 12, they got drafted to SmackDown as the 19th pick.

Alliance with Rick Boogs and Intercontinental Championship pursuit (2021–present) 
On the January 8, 2021, episode of SmackDown, Nakamura competed in a gauntlet match to determine the challenger for the WWE Universal Championship at the Royal Rumble, defeating Rey Mysterio, King Corbin, and Daniel Bryan, the latter of whom he proceeded to shake hands with following Bryan's loss, before he lost to Adam Pearce after being assaulted by champion Roman Reigns and Jey Uso, turning face for the first time since 2018. The following week, Nakamura reverted to his original theme song for his entrance and cemented his face turn by insulting Jey Uso before defeating him in a match. At Royal Rumble on January 31, Nakamura entered No. 7 before he was eliminated by King Corbin. In March, Nakamura would be involved in Cesaro's feud with Seth Rollins after Rollins took Cesaro out of action. This led to a match between Nakamura and Rollins at Fastlane on March 21, where Nakamura lost to Rollins.

On the May 14 episode of SmackDown, Nakamura lost to King Corbin, and attacked him after the match before stealing his crown, starting a feud between the two. The next week, Rick Boogs became an ally of Nakamura, playing the guitar for him during his entrance. On the June 18 episode of SmackDown, Nakamura defeated Corbin in a "Battle for the Crown" match to become the new King. Now known as "King Nakamura", he defeated Corbin on the July 9 episode of SmackDown to qualify for Money in the Bank on July 18. At the event, Nakamura failed to win the match. On the August 13 episode of SmackDown, Nakamura defeated Apollo Crews to win the Intercontinental Championship for the second time in his career. He would have his only title defense as he retained over Apollo in a rematch on the September 24 episode of SmackDown. On the October 8 episode of SmackDown, just prior to the start of the King of the Ring tournament that night, Nakamura relinquished the crown. At Survivor Series on November 21, Nakamura defeated United States Champion Damian Priest by disqualification in a champion vs. champion match. On the February 18, 2022 (taped February 11) episode of SmackDown, Nakamura lost the title to Sami Zayn, ending his reign at 189 days.

On the first night of WrestleMania 38 on April 2, Boogs and Nakamura faced The Usos for the SmackDown Tag Team Championship in a losing effort. On the June 3 episode of SmackDown, he teamed with Riddle to face the Usos for the titles, but lost. He failed to qualify for Money in the Bank when he lost to Sami Zayn on the June 24 episode of SmackDown, and in a last chance battle royal on the following episode of Raw. On the August 12 episode of SmackDown, he faced Gunther for the Intercontinental Championship in a losing effort.

After a brief hiatus, Nakamura returned on the October 19, 2022, edition of NXT, for the first time in over five years as Tony D'Angelo's hand-picked opponent against Channing "Stacks" Lorenzo, whom he would end up defeating. He would later return on the October 28, 2022, edition of SmackDown, as Hit Row's mystery partner in a winning effort against Legado Del Fantasma.

Pro Wrestling Noah (2023) 
On October 30, 2022, Pro Wrestling Noah announced that Nakamura (while under WWE contract) will be The Great Muta's opponent for the Noah The New Year show on January 1, 2023. At the event, Nakamura defeated Muta.

In other media 
Along with fellow NJPW wrestler Kazuchika Okada, Nakamura is featured in the Japanese music video directed by fashion designer, DJ and record producer Nigo for Pharrell Williams' song "Happy", released in May 2014. On May 27, 2014, Nakamura published an autobiography titled King of Strong Style: 1980–2014. An English language version of the book was released by Viz Media on August 7, 2018. Nakamura made his first video game appearance as a playable character in King of Colosseum II in 2004, and made his latest video game appearance in WWE 2K22 as King Nakamura. A later update to the game added his previous gimmick as Shinsuke Nakamura.

Personal life 
Nakamura resides in Orlando, Florida. He has been an avid surfer since 2003. He married Harumi Maekawa in September 2007.

Nakamura also practices Brazilian jiu-jitsu and Shito-ryu karate.

Championships and accomplishments 

 The Baltimore Sun
 WWE Match of the Year (2016) 
 New Japan Pro-Wrestling
 IWGP 3rd Belt Championship (1 time)
 IWGP Heavyweight Championship (3 times)
 IWGP Intercontinental Championship (5 times)
 IWGP Tag Team Championship (1 time) – with Hiroshi Tanahashi
 IWGP U-30 Openweight Championship (1 time)
 NWF Heavyweight Championship (1 time)
 10,000,000 Yen Tag Tournament (2004) – with Hiroyoshi Tenzan
 G1 Climax (2011)
 G1 Tag League (2006) – with Masahiro Chono
 National District Tournament (2006) – with Koji Kanemoto
 New Japan Cup (2014)
 Teisen Hall Cup Six Man Tag Team Tournament (2003) – with Hiro Saito and Tatsutoshi Goto
 Yuko Six Man Tag Team Tournament (2004) – with Blue Wolf and Katsuhiko Nakajima
 Heavyweight Tag MVP Award (2005) with Hiroshi Tanahashi
 New Wave Award (2003)
 Tag Team Best Bout (2004) with Hiroyoshi Tenzan vs. Katsuyori Shibata and Masahiro Chono on October 24
 Technique Award (2004)
 Nikkan Sports
 Match of the Year Award (2009) vs. Hiroshi Tanahashi on November 8
 Match of the Year Award (2014) vs. Kazuchika Okada on August 10
 Outstanding Performance Award (2003)
 Technique Award (2012)
 Pro Wrestling Illustrated
 Most Popular Wrestler of the Year (2016)
 Ranked No. 5 of the best 500 singles wrestlers in the PWI 500 in 2015
 Tokyo Sports
 Best Bout Award (2013) vs. Kota Ibushi on August 4
 Best Bout Award (2014) vs. Kazuchika Okada on August 10
 Rookie of the Year Award (2003)
 Technique Award (2012)
 Wrestling Observer Newsletter
 Most Charismatic (2014, 2015)
 Pro Wrestling Match of the Year (2015) 
 Wrestler of the Year (2014)
 Wrestling Observer Newsletter Hall of Fame (Class of 2015)
 WWE
 NXT Championship (2 times)
 WWE Intercontinental Championship (2 times)
 WWE SmackDown Tag Team Championship (1 time) – with Cesaro
 WWE United States Championship (2 times)
 Men's Royal Rumble (2018)
 NXT Year-End Award (2 times)
 Male Competitor of the Year (2016)
 Overall Competitor of the Year (2016)

Mixed martial arts record 

|-
| Win
|align=center|3–1 (1)
|
|Submission (forearm choke)
|K-1 MMA ROMANEX
|
|align=center|2
|align=center|1:51
|
|
|-
|NC
|align=center|2–1 (1)
|
|NC (overturned)
|K-1 PREMIUM 2003 Dynamite!!
|
|align=center|3 
|align=center|1:19
|
|
|-
| Win
|align=center|2–1
|
|Submission (americana)
|Jungle Fight 1
|
|align=center|1
|align=center|4:29
|
|
|-
| Win
|align=center|1–1
|
|Submission (guillotine choke)
|NJPW Ultimate Crush
|
|align=center|2
|align=center|3:12
|
|
|-
| Loss
|align=center|0–1
|
|Submission (armbar)
|Inoki Bom-Ba-Ye 2002
|
|align=center|2
|align=center|2:14
|
|

Footnotes

References

External links 

 
 
 
 

1980 births
21st-century professional wrestlers
Aoyama Gakuin University alumni
Chaos (professional wrestling) members
Expatriate professional wrestlers
IWGP Heavyweight champions
IWGP Intercontinental champions
Heavyweight mixed martial artists
IWGP Heavyweight Tag Team Champions
Mixed martial artists utilizing wrestling
Japanese male mixed martial artists
Japanese male professional wrestlers
Living people
NWA/WCW/WWE United States Heavyweight Champions
NWF Heavyweight Champions
NXT Champions
Sasuke (TV series) contestants
Sportspeople from Kyoto Prefecture
WWF/WWE Intercontinental Champions
WWF/WWE King Crown's Champions/King of the Ring winners